Tipatchimun (meaning "Legend") is an Innu rock band from the Atlantic province of Newfoundland and Labrador, Canada.  The band sings rock songs in the Innu language.

Band members
David Penashue on vocals/acoustic guitar
Melvin Penashue on vocals/keyboard
Jerome Pone on bass 
Gregory Mark on vocals/guitar

Discography
2000 - Pishum
2004 - Tshenut

References

External links
 Profile on Atlantic Seabreeze
 Information from Newfoundland and Labrador Heritage site

Musical groups with year of establishment missing
Musical groups from Newfoundland and Labrador
First Nations musical groups
Canadian rock music groups